Sarah Tondé (born 30 October 1983) is a Burkinabé track and field athlete who specializes in the Women's 100 metres and Women's 200 metres events. She competed at the 2000 Summer Olympics in the Women's 100 metres event at the age of 16, where she finished in 8th place at 12.56 seconds. She was also the flag bearer of Burkina Faso during the 2000 Summer Olympics opening ceremony.

Sarah currently holds the Burkinabé record for the Women's 100 metres and 200 metres event at 11.56 seconds and 23.34 seconds respectively. In 2002, Sarah received further athletics training in the Sambre et Meuse Athlétique Club in Namur, Belgium.

References 

1983 births
Living people
Burkinabé female sprinters
Olympic athletes of Burkina Faso
Athletes (track and field) at the 2000 Summer Olympics
21st-century Burkinabé people